Bonbon refers to any of several types of sweets, especially small candies enrobed in chocolate.

Bonbon, Bonbons, Bon Bon or Bon-Bon may also refer to:

Geography
 Bon Bon Reserve, South Australia
 222 Margaret Street, Brisbane Bon Bon Tower, nickname for the  skyscraper in Brisbane, Australia
 Bonbon, Grand'Anse, a commune in Haiti

Music
 Bon Bon (singer), American vocalist
 Bon-Bon Blanco (sometimes B3), a Japanese rock group active 2002–2009
 Bon-Bon (vocal group), Bulgarian children's ensemble
Les Bonbons (album), Jacques Brel
"Bon, Bon", 2010 song by Pitbull from Armando
"BonBon", 2016 song by Era Istrefi
"Bon Bon", 1957 song by The Four Voices
"Les Bonbons", 1964 song by Jacques Brel
"Bon Bon Bon", song by Vanessa Quinones

Other uses
 Bon-Bon (short story), by Edgar Allan Poe, featuring character Pierre Bon-Bon
 Bonbon (mobile phone operator), brand in Croatian mobile communications market owned by T-Mobile
 BonBon-Land, amusement park base on the candy brand
 Bon Bon, transvestite character in the 2000 film Before Night Falls, played by Johnny Depp
 Bon Bon, a name given to fictional characters in the My Little Pony franchise, each in different generations respectively
 Comic BomBom, sometimes romanised as 'Comic BonBon', a Japanese manga magazine
 Bon bon chicken, a dish in Chinese cuisine
 Bon-Bon, a minor antagonist from the game Five Nights at Freddy's: Sister Location
Bonbon, a grape beverage manufactured by Haitai.

See also
Bon (disambiguation)
Christmas cracker